African Americans in Louisiana or Black Louisianians are residents of the U.S. state of Louisiana who are of African ancestry; those native to the state since colonial times descend from the many African slaves working on indigo and sugarcane plantations under French colonial rule.

Within the U.S., Louisiana has the fifth largest overall African American population. Louisiana has the second largest percentage of African Americans in the country, only behind Mississippi. As of the 2020 U.S. census, Black Louisianians of African heritage were 32.8% of the state's population.

History 

The first slaves from Africa arrived in Louisiana in 1719 on the Aurore slave ship from Whydah, only a year after the founding of New Orleans. Twenty-three slave ships brought black slaves to Louisiana in French Louisiana alone, almost all embarking prior to 1730. Between 1723 and 1769, most African slaves imported to Louisiana were from modern-day Senegal, Congo, and Benin and many thousands being imported to Louisiana from there.  A large number of the imported slaves from the Senegambia region were members of the Wolof and Bambara ethnic groups. Saint-Louis and Goree Island were sites where a great number of slaves destined for Louisiana departed from Africa. Very few slaves from the Ivory Coast and the Gold Coast were imported in Louisiana except the Mina who were among the most frequent ethnicities in this country. They belong to the Ewe group and their traditional domain is rather centered on the Mono River, encompassing eastern Ghana, the territory of modern Togo, and the west of modern Benin. It is more likely that most of the Mina transported to Louisiana were shipped from the Bight of Benin also known as the Slave Coast. During the Spanish control of Louisiana, between 1770 and 1803, most of the slaves still came from the Congo and the Senegambia region, but they imported also more slaves from modern-day Benin.  Many slaves imported during this period were members of the Nago people, a Yoruba subgroup.

The slaves brought with them their cultural practices, languages, and religious beliefs rooted in spirit and ancestor worship, which were key elements of Louisiana Voodoo. In addition, in the late nineteenth century, many Afro-Haitians also migrated to Louisiana, contributing to the Voodoo tradition of the state.

During the American period (1804–1820), almost half of the African slaves came from the Congo.

Before the American Civil War (1861 to 1865), African Americans comprised the majority of the population in the state, with most being enslaved and working as laborers on sugar cane and cotton plantations.

African Americans left Louisiana by the tens of thousands during the Great Migration in the first half of the 20th century, seeking work and political opportunities elsewhere. As of the 2010 U.S. Census, African Americans were 31.2% of the state's population.

Of all deaths from COVID-19 in 2020, African Americans in Louisiana died in greater numbers than any other racial group.

Louisiana Creoles in Louisiana are of French, Spanish, Native American, and African American ancestry. Creoles of color are Creoles with black ancestry who assimilated into Black culture. There is also an Afro-Gypsy community in Louisiana developed as a consequence of interracial marriage between freed African Americans and enslaved Roma.

Historically black colleges and universities in Louisiana 
There are six historically black colleges (HBCU) established in Louisiana. The Southern University System is the country's first and only HBCU college system.

Culture 

African Americans have contributed to Louisiana's culture, music, and cuisine. African slaves have influenced New Orleans dishes such as gumbo.
African slaves also brought Louisiana Voodoo to the state. African Americans have influenced the music of Louisiana and helped develop jazz, blues, hip hop, R&B, Zydeco, and Bounce music in the state.

Notable people

Lil Wayne, musician
Anthony Mackie, actor
Tyler Perry, actor
Madam C. J. Walker, entrepreneur 
Louis Armstrong, trumpeter 
Bill Russell, basketball player
Randy Jackson, bassist
YoungBoy Never Broke Again, rapper
Kevin Gates, rapper
Johnnie Cochran, lawyer 
Clyde Drexler, former professional basketball player
Mahalia Jackson, singer
Karl Malone, former professional basketball player
Bryan Christopher Williams, musician, entrepreneur
P. B. S. Pinchback, former governor of Louisiana
Sidney Bechet, musician
Buddy Bolden, jazz pioneer
James Booker, musician
Fats Domino, rock n' roll pioneer
Mannie Fresh, record producer, musician
Buddy Guy, blues musician
Boosie Badazz, musician
Juvenile, musician
Ernie K-Doe, singer
Lloyd (singer), musician
Ellis Marsalis Sr., jazz musician, civil rights activist
Frank Ocean, Grammy Award-nominated R&B singer
Wendell Pierce, actor
Professor Longhair, musician
Allen Toussaint, musician
Buckwheat Zydeco, zydeco musician
Leah Chase, chef
Jon Batiste, singer

See also

 Louisiana African American Heritage Trail
 History of slavery in Louisiana
 Creoles of color
 Louisiana Creole people
 Cajuns
 French Louisianians
 Isleños
 Black Southerners
 Demographics of Louisiana
 List of African-American newspapers in Louisiana

References

External links

64 Parishe
Slavery In Louisiana | Whitney Plantation
African Presence in Louisiana
African Americans of New Orleans
The African American Experience in Louisiana

Further reading
Africans In Colonial Louisiana: The Development of Afro-Creole Culture in the Eighteenth-Century
 African Americans in Lafayette and Southwest Louisiana
 The African American Experience in Louisiana: From the Civil War to Jim Crow (Louisiana Purchase Bicentennial Series in Louisiana History)